Op hoop van zegen  (translated as "on hope and blessing") is a 1918 Dutch silent drama film directed by Maurits Binger.

Cast
 Esther De Boer-van Rijk - Kniertje
 Annie Bos - Jo
 Willem van der Veer - Geert
 Frits Bouwmeester - Barend
 Jan van Dommelen - Reder Bos
 Antoinette Gerritsen - Clementine Bos
 Willem Hunsche - Simon
 Jeanne Van der Pers - Marietje
 Theo Frenkel Jr. - Mees
 Paula de Waart - Truus
 Jan Grader - Boekhouder Kaps

External links 
 

1918 films
Dutch silent feature films
Dutch black-and-white films
1918 drama films
Films directed by Maurits Binger
Dutch films based on plays
Dutch drama films
Silent drama films